Lakhai is an upazila of Habiganj District in the Division of Sylhet, Bangladesh.

History
Following the 1303 Conquest of Sylhet, Bayazid Shah, a companion of Shah Jalal, took refuge in Bulla and propagated Islam there. Bayazid remains buried in a mazar (mausoleum) in Bulla bazaar.

Lakhai was previously under the sub-registry of Charabhanga in modern-day Madhabpur Upazila.  On 10 January 1922, the Lakhai thana was established as per Assam Province's gazette notification 176GK.

During the Bangladesh Liberation War of 1971, a massacre was conducted in the village of Krishnapur on 18 September. The Pakistani Army also attacked the villages of Murakari and Bhabanipur. In the village of Madna, the army set fire to the house of Dewan Ali. On 29 October, the Pakistani forces took shelter in the houses of some brokers at night in Muriyauk. Early in the morning, they wanted to go to the house of Shahjahan Chishti, a freedom fighter in Muriyauk. Unable to find Chishti at his house, the forces captured his sixty-year-old father, Abdul Jabbar, and set the house on fire. In the same village, the forces also captured 65-year old Idris Ali, father of Bengali freedom fighter Ilias Kamal. They then proceeded to kidnap the two old men to Lakhai Union. According to some sources, the next day the forces took a speed boat to Bhairab and the old men were shot dead on the way and were never found.

In 1983, Lakhai was promoted to a designated police station through the efforts of many people. On 15 April 1983, the foundation was laid for a police station at Kalauk in Bhadikara Mouza, Bamai Union. In 1984, there was a circle officer development outpost in modern-day Swajangram in Lakhai Union.

Geography
It has 19,465 households and total area of 196.56 km2. Lakhai is the connecting point of 3 administrative divisions Sylhet, Dhaka & Chittagong of Bangladesh. It is surrounded by Habiganj Sadar Upazila, Baniachang Upazila, Madhabpur Upazila of Habiganj, Nasirnagar Upazila of Brahmanbaria and Austagram Upazila of Kishoreganj where Lakhai Upazila is the centre Point. Main rivers are: Meghna, Sutang, Monikhai, Balabhadra rivers

Demographics

According to the 2011 Bangladesh census, Lakhai Upazila had 27,759 households and a population of 148,811, 11.6% of whom lived in urban areas. 16.1% of the population was under the age of 5. The literacy rate (age 7 and over) was 33.7%, compared to the national average of 51.8%.

Economy
Lakhai consists of both plain lands and haor areas, not only self-sufficient in food and fish but also exports, is famous for paddy, jute and winter corps.

Points of interest
Kalauk, Bhadikara, Bamai, Katihara, Lakhai, Amanullahpur (Borbari) Morakori, Muriauk, Karab, Bulla, Madna, Sinhagram, Begunai, Teghoria, Shibpur, Krishnapur, Dharmapur, Moshadia, Fulbaria, Satauk, Sajangram, Begunai, Rarishal, Marugach, Noagaon, Sontoshpur, Zirunda Manpur, Kamrapur, Montoil, Shuneswar, Moubari, Gonipoor, Kataia, Foridpur, Bali, Chondipur, Morshidpur.

Administration
Lakhai Upazila is divided into six union parishads: Bamai, Bulla, Karab, Lakhai, Murakari, and Muriauk. The union parishads are subdivided into 70 mauzas and 65 villages.

Transport
Lakhai is connected through Habiganj, Ashuganj, Fandauk, Chatiain by road; Bhairab by launch and Shayestaganj, Shahjibazar, Nayapara by rail communications. Regional highway runs through Sarail, Nasirnagar, Lakhai, Habiganj route is important for road communications in this region. Lakhai–Dhaka and Lakhai–Sylhet direct bus services are available.

Lakhai was river based upazila in the past. But nowadays it has developed immediately.

Education and culture
At the 2001 census the average literacy rate of Lakhai Upazila was 28.7% (7+ years), where national average is 46.2%.

Lakhai is famous for pithas and hospitality, rich with cross cultures of greater Sylhet, Dhaka & Chittagong's flavour and foreign connections, it is unique of Bangladesh.

There is a non-governmental orphanage in Battala called Nurul Huda Orphanage. Notable  are Mashadiya and Kataiya Eidgah and well-known mosques are Teghoriya Mosque, Singhgram Masjid and Bhadikara Mosque.

Educational institutes include
 Karab Nuria Islamia Madrasah
 Fulbaria Mujibia Islamia Hafizia Madrasa
 Lakhai Muktijoddha Degree College
 Kalauk High School, (Upazila Sadar)
 Zirunda Manpur Tofailia Senior Madrasa
 Muriauk High School
 Dharmapur baage Modina Gausia Dakhil Madrasa
 Bamai Model High School (founded 1961)
 Rarhishal Korab High School
 Amanullahpur Shafikia Hafizia Madrasah, (Borbari)
 Lakhai Darul Hoda madrasah & Yeateem Khana
 Bhabanipur High School
 Kataia Darussalam Islamia Madrasa
 Katihara Hafizia Madrasah
 Teghoria Darul Ulom Madrasah
 Morakori High School (founded 1962)
 Bulla Singhgram Girls High School
 Teghoria SEDF Model High School
 Krishnapur High School
 Korab Rahmania Dakhil Madrasa
 Fulbaria Ebtedaee Madrasa

Notable residents
 Mostafa Ali, former parliamentarian
 Mukhlesur Rahman Chowdhury, journalist, editor, and adviser in the caretaker government of President Iajuddin Ahmed, attended Lakhai A.C.R.C. Pilot High School.

See also
 Upazilas of Bangladesh
 Districts of Bangladesh
 Divisions of Bangladesh

References

Upazilas of Habiganj District